Elophila fluvialis is a moth in the family Crambidae. It was described by Schaus in 1912.  It is found in Costa Rica.

References

Acentropinae
Moths described in 1912
Moths of Central America